Darío Acosta (born 9 September 1987) is a Uruguayan tennis player.

Acosta has a career high ATP singles ranking of 1366 achieved on 27 July 2009. He also has a career high ATP doubles ranking of 1320 achieved on 19 October 2009.

Acosta represents Uruguay at the Davis Cup, where he has a W/L record of 0–1.

External links

1987 births
Living people
Uruguayan male tennis players